Fran Meersman (born 15 October 2002) is a Belgian footballer who plays as a defender for Gent and the Belgium national team.

International career
Meersman made her debut for the Belgium national team on 12 June 2021, coming on as a substitute for Davinia Vanmechelen against Luxembourg.

References

2002 births
Living people
Women's association football defenders
Belgian women's footballers
Belgium women's international footballers
K.A.A. Gent (women) players
Super League Vrouwenvoetbal players
Belgium women's youth international footballers